The 2001 Aston by-election was held in the Australian electorate of Aston in Victoria on 14 July 2001. The by-election was triggered by the death of the sitting member, the Liberal Party of Australia's Peter Nugent, on 24 April 2001. The writ for the by-election was issued on 1 June 2001.

Background
The by-election was an important test for the Liberal Party. The federal Liberal government had introduced a controversial Goods and Services Tax just over a year before, and unpopular sentiment surrounding the government and its GST were believed to have led to the defeat of the Coalition in Western Australia and Queensland state elections in landslides. The Liberals had also lost the seat of Ryan in a recent by-election, and the ALP led by Kim Beazley was ahead in opinion polls.

Results

Aftermath
Chris Pearce won the by-election, retaining Aston for the Liberal Party, but suffering a swing of 3.66%. Prime Minister John Howard appeared on the first episode of the ABC program Insiders the next day, where he suggested that Labor's electoral momentum had been held in check, and the government was back in the game:

The Howard government reportedly spent $700,000 on political advertising in the lead-up to the by-election.

See also
 List of Australian federal by-elections
 2023 Aston by-election

References

External links
Aston (VIC) By-Election (14 July 2001) Results, Australian Electoral Commission

2001 elections in Australia
Victorian federal by-elections
July 2001 events in Australia
2000s in Victoria (Australia)